Donald Petrie (7 September 1846 – 1 September 1925) was a Scottish botanist noted for his work in New Zealand.

Petrie was born in the parish of Edinkillie, Moray, on  7 September 1846 and educated at Aberdeen Grammar School and the University of Aberdeen.

He taught at the Glasgow Free Church Training College, the Glasgow Academy and Scotch College in Melbourne, Australia, before being appointed inspector of schools with the provincial government in Otago, New Zealand, in October 1873.

An active member of the Otago Institute, Petrie was elected a fellow of the Linnean Society of London (1886) and served as president of the Auckland Institute (1896). He was one of the 20 original fellows of the New Zealand Institute in 1911 and held several positions there, including council member, member of the board of governors, and president in 1915.

He died in 1925.

Species named in Petrie's honour
 Carmichaelia petriei

Abbreviation

References

1846 births
1925 deaths
People from Moray
Scottish emigrants to New Zealand
Scottish botanists
Alumni of the University of Aberdeen
Fellows of the Linnean Society of London
People educated at Aberdeen Grammar School
Fellows of the Royal Society of New Zealand
Plant collectors
20th-century New Zealand botanists
19th-century New Zealand botanists
Presidents of the Royal Society of New Zealand